The Wills Wing Condor is an American high-wing, single-place, hang glider that was designed and produced by Wills Wing of Santa Ana, California. Now out of production, when it was available the aircraft was supplied complete and ready-to-fly.

Design and development
The Condor was designed as a flight training glider specifically to introduce new pilots to hang gliding. It was specifically intended for sale only to professional hang gliding instructors for teaching solo students during their early glider-handling lessons. It was designed to be easy to ground handle, launch and fly in very light winds from a shallow hill.

It is made from 7075-T6 aluminum tubing, with the control bar and kingpost made from 6061-T6 aluminum. The single-surface wing is covered in Dacron sailcloth. Its  span wing is cable braced from a single kingpost.

The sole model in the line, the Condor 330, is named for its wing area in square feet. It is DHV and HGMA certified.

Specifications (Condor 330)

References

External links
Official Manual for the Condor 330
Photo of a Wills Wing Condor 330

Condor
Hang gliders